Federico José González Luna Bueno (born 3 June 1966) is a Mexican politician affiliated with the PVEM. As of 2013 he served as Deputy of the LXII Legislature of the Mexican Congress representing Veracruz.

References

1966 births
Living people
People from Mexico City
Ecologist Green Party of Mexico politicians
21st-century Mexican politicians
Deputies of the LXII Legislature of Mexico
Members of the Chamber of Deputies (Mexico) for Veracruz